You Can Count on Me is a 2000 American film.

You Can Count on Me may also refer to:

 "You Can Count on Me" (Panda Bear song), 2010
 You Can Count on Me, a 1983 album by Ray Griff
 "You Can Count on Me", a 2017 song by Ansel Elgort featuring Logic
 "You Can Count on Me", a 2018 song by Trophy Eyes
 "You Can Count on Me", a song by David Allan Coe from the 1978 album  Human Emotions
 "You Can Count on Me", a song by Luv Bug entered by Ireland in the Eurovision Song Contest 1986
 "You Can Count on Me", a song by Shalamar from the 1983 album The Look
 "You Can Count on Me", a song by Spyro Gyra from the 1991 album Collection

See also
 Count On Me (disambiguation)